John Hurley Eason (16 August 1912 – date of death unknown) was an Australian rugby league footballer who played in the 1930s and an Australian Army serviceman who fought in the Second World War.

Playing career

Jack Eason lived on the Woronora River, and was graded from the local Sutherland JRLFC in 1935. He was remembered as a vigorous second rower that played mainly reserve grade at the St. George Dragons, although he did feature in two first grade games during the 1935 NSWRFL season. Eason was also a noted professional boxer in Sydney during the mid 1930s.

References

St. George Dragons players
Australian rugby league players
Rugby league second-rows
Rugby league players from New South Wales
Australian Army personnel of World War II
Australian Army soldiers
1912 births
Year of death missing